Matthew Glover is a British businessman and co-founder of the Veganuary movement, which his wife Jane Land helped to create. He advocates for pragmatism when communicating with farmers, food manufacturers, retailers and restaurants, and a collaborative approach for developing more plant-based foods. In addition, he is the founder of Veg Capital, which helps fund technologies developing plant-based, fermented and cultivated alternative proteins. In December 2020, Glover and Adam Lyons created the food brand VFC, a business that went on to become an international venture.

Career
Glover started his first business aged twenty-one and has built companies in the construction, glazing and events sectors. Glover is married to Jane Land, whom he originally met on a vegan dating website and they live near York. Glover came from a family of butchers, converted to veganism and his interest was initially with animal welfare and sustainability. Together, Glover and Land attended street activism and vegan demonstrations. They felt like they were being ignored and subsequently they wanted to create something productive. The concept of Veganuary was created by Glover and Land in 2014. The campaign aims to get more people eating plant-based foods. In its first year, Glover and Land put their life savings into the Veganuary project and moved in with Glover's mother. The campaign has surpassed one million sign ups since its launch and is now a UK registered charity. By 2022, The Veganuary event has grown to become one of the most successful vegan campaigns worldwide with celebrity supporters including Brian May, Joanna Lumley, Joaquin Phoenix, and Deborah Meaden. That year another 600,000 people signed up to take part. In addition more businesses than ever promoted the event.

In 2019, Glover launched the "Million Dollar Vegan" (now GenV) charity brand. GenV is dedicated to educating people about the environmental, ethical and health benefits of living a plant-based lifestyle. Its aim is to inspire more people to become vegan and operates in ten countries. The brand soon received support from Paul McCartney, Chris Packham and Moby. The organisation was founded after Glover and Land, with the backing of McCartney, challenged Pope Francis to become vegan for Lent. In return, they pledged to donate one million dollars to Pope Francis' chosen charity, but he did not accept the challenge. Their second campaign challenged US President Donald Trump to become vegan during January 2020. In exchange for his participation the same one million dollar charity reward was offered, though Trump too declined. Glover is the current president of the charity.

In June 2020, Glover launched a plant-based investment business. The not-for-profit venture was designed to help fund the growth of companies developing meat, dairy, eggs and seafood replacements with plant-based, recombinant and cultivated ingredients. Glover currently serves as the managing director of the company Veg Capital.

In December 2020, Glover and restaurateur Adam Lyons co-founded the food brand VFC, which specialises in meat free alternatives for fried chicken. The company was founded in York, United Kingdom. Glover treated the brand as a form of business activism against the factory farming of chickens. He told Maxine Gordon from The Press that "this is where food meets activism. This is our sit-down protest." The company experienced rapid growth and secured a supermarket distribution deal with Tesco and Sainsbury's. In the first year of trading, the business expanded its sales into Spain, Netherlands and the United States markets.

In July 2022, Glover co-founded Sentient Ventures, a new UK venture fund to invest in early-stage growth capital for alt protein startups globally.

References

Living people
British activists
British animal rights activists
British veganism activists
Year of birth missing (living people)